The yellow-browed shrike-vireo (Vireolanius eximius) is a species of bird in the family Vireonidae.

It is found in Colombia and adjacent areas of Panama and Venezuela. Its natural habitats are subtropical or tropical moist lowland forests and subtropical or tropical moist montane forests.

References

yellow-browed shrike-vireo
Birds of Colombia
yellow-browed shrike-vireo
Taxonomy articles created by Polbot